Julia Creek Airport  is an airport in Julia Creek, Queensland, Australia.

Julia Creek Airport opened a new terminal building on 7 March 2012. Passenger numbers for the scheduled Rex Airline services to Mount Isa and Townsville are steadily increasing.

Airlines and destinations

See also
 List of airports in Queensland

References

External links
 Official site

Airports in Queensland
North West Queensland